Science Museum may refer to:
 Science museum, a type of museum
 Arktikum Science Museum, a museum in Rovaniemi, Finland
 Hong Kong Science Museum, a museum in Kowloon, Hong Kong
 Science Museum of the University of Coimbra, a museum in Coimbra, Portugal

United Kingdom
 Science Museum, Birmingham, a former name of the Museum of Science and Industry, Birmingham, UK
 Science Museum, London, a museum in London, UK
 Science and Industry Museum, Manchester, UK
 Science Museum at Wroughton, the object store near Swindon for the London Science Museum, UK

United States
 Museum of Science (Boston), US
 Science Museum Oklahoma, a museum in Oklahoma City, Oklahoma, US
 Science Museum of Virginia, a museum in Richmond, Virginia, US
 Science Museum of Minnesota, a museum in Saint Paul, Minnesota, US

See also
 List of science museums
 National Science Museum (disambiguation)
 National Museum of Science (disambiguation)
 Science and Technology Museum (disambiguation)